The 2021 Suncorp Super Netball season was the fifth season of the premier netball league in Australia. The season commenced on 1 May and concluded with the Grand Final on 28 August. The defending premiers were the Melbourne Vixens, but they were unsuccessful in making the finals series. The New South Wales Swifts won their second premiership in three years, after defeating Giants Netball 63–59 in the Grand Final.

Overview

Teams

Format
The season is played over fourteen rounds, allowing every team to play each other twice, once at home and once away. The top four teams on the ladder at the conclusion of the regular season qualify for the finals series. In the first week of the finals series, the 1st ranked team hosts the 2nd ranked team in the major semi-final (with the winner of that match to qualify for the Grand Final) and the 3rd ranked team hosts the 4th ranked team in the minor semi-final (with the loser of that match eliminated). The loser of the major semi-final then hosts the winner of the minor semi-final in the preliminary final. The winner of the major semi-final then hosts the winner of the preliminary final in the Grand Final.

Rules
The league retained the two-goal super shot rule, which allowed a goal shooter or attacker to score two goals for a shot successfully made in the designated area inside the circle during the last five minutes of each quarter. The league also retained the rolling substitutions that were introduced the previous season. The decision to retain the super shot was met with disapproval from many fans and players, with Australian Netball Players’ Association CEO Kathryn Harby-Williams saying a player survey indicated 60 per cent were opposed to the super shot. Extra time in the event of drawn matches was retained. In the event of a tied score at the end of the fourth quarter, a five-minute period of extra time is played, and if the teams remain tied, the match is declared a draw. The bonus point system, last utilised in the 2019 season, was not implemented, with the league's competition committee saying it would "be shelved for the foreseeable future".

West Coast Fever salary cap breach
The West Coast Fever commenced the season on negative-12 premiership points after a Netball Australia investigation discovered the club had paid players more than $120,000 above the salary cap in each of the 2018 and 2019 seasons. The Fever were also fined $300,000 ($150,000 of which was suspended), making the penalties the harshest in Australian netball history.

Player signings
Important dates in relation to player signings for the 2021 season were:
 13 July – 18 October 2020: Clubs had the exclusive right to re-sign any of their existing contracted players, permanent or temporary replacement players or training partners from the Australian Netball League (ANL) on a single year contract for the 2021 season
 19 October – 16 November 2020: Teams can officially sign any free agents as one of their contracted players on a one-year contract for the 2021 season
 16–30 November 2020: Teams can commence signing training partners for the 2021 season.

All player contracts were required to expire at the end of the 2021 season in accordance with the provisions of an agreement struck between Netball Australia and the Australian Netball Players’ Association during the COVID-19 pandemic.

The following table is a list of players who moved clubs/leagues into Super Netball, or were elevated to a permanent position in the senior team during the off-season. It does not include players who were re-signed by their original Super Netball clubs.

Regular season
 Source: Click here (all times in AEST)

Round 1

Round 2

Round 3

Round 4

Round 5

Round 6

Round 7

Round 8

Round 9

Round 10

Round 11

Round 12

Round 13

Round 14

Ladder

Finals series

Major semi-final

Minor semi-final

Preliminary final

Grand Final

 Grand Final MVP Winner: Maddy Turner

Awards
The following players were awarded for their performances in the 2021 season:

 The Player of the Year Award was won by Jhaniele Fowler of the West Coast Fever.
 The Grand Final MVP Award was won by Maddy Turner of the New South Wales Swifts.
 The Rising Star Award was won by Sophie Dwyer of Giants Netball.
 The Joyce Brown Coach of the Year award was won by Briony Akle of the New South Wales Swifts.
 The Leading Goalscorer Award was won by Jhaniele Fowler of the West Coast Fever, who scored 891 goals.
 The following players were named in the Super Netball Team of the Year:

Attackers
 Goal Shooter: Jhaniele Fowler(West Coast Fever)
 Goal Attack: Jo Harten(Giants Netball)

Midcourters
 Wing Attack: Maddie Hay(Giants Netball)
 Centre: Kim Ravaillion(Queensland Firebirds)
 Wing Defence: Gabi Simpson(Queensland Firebirds)

Defenders
 Goal Defence: Sunday Aryang(West Coast Fever)
 Goal Keeper: Courtney Bruce(West Coast Fever)

Reserves
 Attack Reserve: Samantha Wallace(New South Wales Swifts)
 Midcourt Reserve: Jamie-Lee Price(Giants Netball)
 Defence Reserve: Shamera Sterling(Adelaide Thunderbirds)

References

External links
 

2021
2021 in Australian netball